"Be My Baby" is a song by American girl group the Ronettes that was released as a single on Philles Records in August 1963. Written by Jeff Barry, Ellie Greenwich, and Phil Spector, the song was the Ronettes' biggest hit, reaching number 2 in the U.S. and number 4 in the UK. It is often ranked as among the best songs of the 1960s, and it is regarded by some as one of the greatest songs of all time.

Spector produced "Be My Baby" at Gold Star Studios with his de facto house band, later known as "the Wrecking Crew". It marked the first time that he recorded with a full orchestra, and the song is regarded as the quintessential example of his Wall of Sound recording technique. Ronnie Spector (then known as Veronica Bennett) is the only Ronette that appears on the track. In 1964, it appeared on the album Presenting the Fabulous Ronettes.

In the decades since its release, "Be My Baby" has been played on radio and television over 3 million times. The song has influenced many artists, most notably the Beach Boys' Brian Wilson, who wrote the 1964 hit "Don't Worry Baby" as a response to "Be My Baby". Many others have replicated or recreated the drum phrase—one of the most recognizable in pop music. The song has returned to the U.S. top 40 via cover versions by Andy Kim and Jody Miller. In 2006, the Library of Congress inducted the Ronettes' recording into the United States National Recording Registry.

Background
"Be My Baby" was written by Phil Spector, Jeff Barry, and Ellie Greenwich at Spector's office in Los Angeles. Early in 1963, Spector auditioned a vocal group trio – composed of sisters Veronica (also known as "Ronnie") and Estelle Bennett with their cousin Nedra Talley – who were performing under the names "Ronnie and the Relatives" and "the Ronettes". Impressed by Ronnie's lead on an impromptu performance of the 1956 hit "Why Do Fools Fall in Love", Spector offered an original song for the group to record, "Why Don't They Let Us Fall in Love". They recorded the song at Gold Star Studios, but Spector withheld its release, as he had felt that the group needed more time to refine their stage act.

Spector, who had been struggling with marital issues, developed a romantic fixation on Ronnie at this time. Biographer Mick Brown surmised that Spector may have "intended 'Be My Baby' as an explicit declaration of his growing feelings for Ronnie", and that the song, in retrospect, served as a foreshadowing of their marriage, which lasted from the late 1960s through the early 1970s. Singer Darlene Love, who had recorded with Spector, said that "Be My Baby" was effectively a means for Spector to declare his love to Ronnie.

Composition and lyrics
"Be My Baby" is in the key of E major. The verse chord progression runs through an E–F#m–B change twice, followed by G#7–C#7–F#–B7. The chorus is a standard I–vi–IV–V doo-wop progression.

Music journalist Marc Spitz wrote of the song's subject matter, "At its heart, 'Be My Baby' is as much about power and control as it is about romance. Lyrically it also marks a bold moment in pop music, when a woman makes a play for a man while infantilizing him. Usually the reverse was the norm."

Recording

Backing track
On July 29, 1963, Spector produced "Be My Baby" at Gold Star Studios in Los Angeles with his de facto house band, later known as "the Wrecking Crew". The session marked the first occasion that Spector has recorded with a full orchestra at Gold Star. According to Brown, Spector was "determined to make his most towering production yet" and summoned "the full complement of his troops in Gold Star — battalions of pianos and guitars, brass, strings, the full regiment of backing singers". The song was arranged by Spector regular Jack Nitzsche and engineered by Larry Levine.

The instrumentation on "Be My Baby" features piano, guitars, brass, shakers, castanets, bass, handclaps, strings and drums. Levine remarked, "I love those strings, particularly at the end. They made me cry when I was mixing." Guitars on the session were played by Tommy Tedesco and Bill Pitman, after whom the instrumental "Tedesco and Pitman" on the B-side of the single was named.

According to Brown, the opening drum beat, played by Hal Blaine, was suggested by Nitzsche. However, Blaine himself stated, "That famous drum intro was an accident. I was supposed to play the snare on the second beat as well as the fourth, but I dropped a stick. Being the faker I was in those days, I left the mistake in and it became: 'Bum-ba-bum-BOOM!' And soon everyone wanted that beat."

Owing to Spector's perfectionism, the band rehearsed the song for four hours in the studio before the tape recorders were turned on. One of the four keyboard players, Michael Spencer, recalled, "That session took three and a half hours. There's this pause towards the end of the song where the drums go boom-ba-boom-boom before the song picks up again. I remember that by the fortieth or forty-first take I was so punchy, I played right through it, and we had to do it again. And that subsequent take was the one Phil used."

Vocals

Ronnie – the only Ronette who appears on the record – overdubbed her lead vocal within a day after the backing track had been completed. She spent the previous three days preparing for the session. Ronnie remembered, "I was so shy that I'd do all my vocal rehearsals in the studio's ladies' room, because I loved the sound I got in there. People talk about how great the echo chamber was at Gold Star, but they never heard the sound in that ladies' room... That's where all the little 'whoa-ohs' and 'oh-oh-oh-ohs' you hear on my records were born." She said that when she sang the song at the session, "the band went nuts. I was 18 years old, 3,000 miles from home, and had all these guys saying I was the next Billie Holiday."

Nitzsche praised Ronnie's vibrato, saying, "That was her strong point. When that tune was finished, the speakers were turned up so high in the booth that people had to leave the room." Levine said, "We didn't have to work hard to get Ronnie's performance, but we had to work hard to satisfy Phil. He'd spend an inordinate amount of time working on each section and playing it back before moving on to the next one, and that was very hard for the singers." In his book Classic Tracks, author Rikky Rooksby writes, "Notice Ronnie Spector's voice is kept quite dry and upfront; her vocal, and those carefully rehearsed wha-ah-oh-ohs, along with the vast sound, make the record what it is."

Sonny Bono and Cher were among the backing vocalists. Cher stated in a television interview, "I was just hanging out with Son [Bono], and one night Darlene [Love] didn't show up, and Philip looked at me and he was getting really cranky, y'know. Philip was not one to be kept waiting. And he said, 'Sonny said you can sing?' And so, as I was trying to qualify what I felt my... 'expertise' was, he said, 'Look I just need noise – get out there!' I started as noise, and that was 'Be My Baby'."

Release

"Be My Baby" (backed with "Tedesco and Pitman") was released by Philles Records in August 1963 and reached number 2 on the  Billboard Pop Singles Chart by the end of the summer. In the UK, it was issued by London Recordings in October and peaked at number 4 on Record Retailer. By the end of the year, the single had sold more than two million copies.

The Ronettes' first royalty cheque for the song totaled $14,000 (equivalent to $ in ). In her 1991 memoir, Ronnie wrote that the group subsequently had dinner with Spector to celebrate their success; at the end of the meal, however, he asked them to cover the bill. Ronnie remarked, "For a millionaire, he sure could be cheap."

In her autobiography, Ronnie relates that she was on tour with Joey Dee and the Starlighters when "Be My Baby" was introduced by Dick Clark on American Bandstand as the "Record of the Century." It remains the Ronettes' most successful song; although the group enjoyed several more top 40 hits, they sold at underwhelming volumes compared to "Be My Baby".  In a 1999 interview, Ronnie cited "Be My Baby" as one of her top five favorite songs in her catalog.

A live rendition of "Be My Baby" was performed by the Ronettes on the 1966 rock concert film The Big TNT Show, for which Spector was the musical director and associate producer.

Impact and influence

"Be My Baby" was a major influence on artists such as the Beatles and the Beach Boys, who went on to innovate with their own studio productions. Producer Steve Levine compared the track's groundbreaking quality to the Beach Boys' "Good Vibrations" (1966), 10cc's "I'm Not in Love" (1975), and Queen's "Bohemian Rhapsody" (1975). Many subsequent popular songs have replicated or recreated the drum phrase—one of the most recognizable in popular music. Producer Rick Nowels, who lifted the drum beat for a Lana Del Rey song, said, "'Be My Baby,' for me, is Ground Zero for the modern pop era. it was a line in the sand that left everything that came before in the rear view mirror. It was the beginning of pop music being a serious American art form."

AllMusic's Jason Ankeny noted in his review of the song, "No less an authority than Brian Wilson has declared 'Be My Baby' the greatest pop record ever made—no arguments here." In his 2004 book  Sonic Alchemy: Visionary Music Producers and Their Maverick Recordings, David Howard writes that many regard ""Be My Baby" as "Spector's greatest achievement—two and a half sweaty minutes of sexual pop perfection."

In 2016, Barbara Cane, vice president and general manager of writer-publisher relations for the songwriters' agency BMI, estimated that the song has been played in 3.9 million feature presentations on radio and television since 1963. "That means it's been played for the equivalent of 17 years back to back."

Effect on Brian Wilson

"Be My Baby" had a profound lifelong impact on the Beach Boys' founder Brian Wilson. His biographer Peter Ames Carlin describes the song as becoming "a spiritual touchstone" for Wilson, while music historian Luis Sanchez states that it formed an enduring part of Wilson's mythology, being the Spector record that "etched itself the deepest into Brian's mind... it comes up again and again in interviews and biographies, variably calling up themes of deep admiration, a source of consolation, and a baleful haunting of the spirit." Sanchez goes on to write, 

Wilson first heard "Be My Baby" while driving and listening to the radio; he became so enthralled by the song that he felt compelled to pull over to the side of the road and analyze the chorus. Wilson immediately concluded that it was the greatest record he had ever heard. He bought the single and kept it on his living room jukebox, listening to it whenever the mood struck him. Copies of the song were located everywhere inside his home, as well as inside his car and in the studio.

As a response to "Be My Baby", Wilson conceived the song "Don't Worry Baby". He originally submitted "Don't Worry Baby" for the Ronettes' consideration, but this motion was halted by Spector, who had a policy against producing records that he himself did not write. Spector was aware of Wilson's obsession with "Be My Baby" and later remarked that he would "like to have a nickel for every joint [Brian] smoked" trying to figure out the record's sound.

Among the many other documented anecdotes related to Wilson's fixation on "Be My Baby", his bandmate and cousin Mike Love remembered him comparing the song to Albert Einstein's theory of relativity. Similarly, music journalist David Dalton, who visited Wilson's home in 1967, said that Wilson had analyzed "Be My Baby" "like an adept memorizing the Koran." Dalton later wrote about a box of tapes he had discovered in Wilson's bedroom: 

Wilson's daughter Carnie (born 1968) stated that, during her childhood, she "woke up every morning to boom boom-boom pow! Boom boom-boom pow! Every day." In the early 1970s, Wilson instructed his engineer Stephen Desper to create a tape loop consisting only of the final chorus in "Be My Baby". Wilson listened to the loop for several hours in what Desper saw as "some kind of a trance." The Beach Boys' 1977 song "Mona", written by Wilson, ends with the lines "Listen to 'Be My Baby' / I know you're going to love Phil Spector".

During a 1980 appearance on Good Morning America, host Joan Lunden inquired Wilson for his musical tastes, to which Wilson replied simply with "I listen to a song called 'Be My Baby' by the Ronettes." Wilson told The New York Times in 2013 that he had listened to the song at least 1,000 times. Beach Boy Bruce Johnston gave a higher estimation: "Brian must have played 'Be My Baby' ten million times. He never seemed to get tired of it." In Wilson's 2016 memoir, I Am Brian Wilson, he recalled once playing the song's drum intro "ten times until everyone in the room told me to stop, and then I played it ten more times."

Personnel
According to the AFM contract sheet, excluding the vocals and string overdubs, the following musicians played on the track.

Don Randi - session leader; keyboards
Lou Blackburn - trombone
Hal Blaine - drums
Jimmy Bond - double bass
Leon Russell - keyboards
Frank Capp - percussion
Roy Caton - trumpet
Al De Lory - keyboards
Steve Douglas - tenor saxophone
Jay Migliori - baritone saxophone
Bill Pitman - guitar
Ray Pohlman - bass guitar
Michael Spencer - keyboards
Tommy Tedesco - guitar

Cover versions

 1970 – Andy Kim released a version of the song as a single. In the U.S., his version spent 11 weeks on the Billboard Hot 100, reaching No. 17, and No. 24 on Billboards Easy Listening chart. It also reached No. 12 on the Cash Box Top 100. In Canada, the song reached No. 6 on the RPM 100, while reaching No. 16 on the New Zealand Listener chart, No. 24 in West Germany, and No. 36 on Australia's Go-Set National Top 60. It was also a hit in Brazil. Kim's version was ranked No. 80 on RPMs year end ranking of the "RPM 100 Top Singles of '71".
 1972 – Jody Miller released a version as a single and on the album There's a Party Goin' On. Her version reached No. 15 on Billboards Hot Country Singles chart and No. 35 on Billboards Easy Listening chart. It also reached No. 15 on the Cash Box Country Top 75 and Record Worlds Country Singles Chart. In Canada, the song reached No. 11 on the RPM Country Playlist.
 1976 – Shaun Cassidy released a cover of the song on his eponymous debut album. The following year it was released as a single and reached No. 39 in West Germany.
 1992 – Teen Queens released a cover of the song that reached number 6 on the Australian ARIA Singles Chart in May 1992. It was certified Gold in Australia and was the country's 44th-most-successful song of 1992.
 2013 – Leslie Grace covered the song in bachata for her eponymous album in a bilingual version in English and Spanish. Her version peaked at number 8 on the Billboard Hot Latin Songs and number 6 on the Tropical Songs chart.

In popular culture
 The lyric "whoa-oh-oh-oh" was reprised in their follow-up single "Baby, I Love You".
 The song appears in the opening credit sequence of Martin Scorsese's film Mean Streets (1973). Scorsese used the song without legal clearance, allowing Spector to take a bite out of Scorsese's earnings for years. Similarly, the song appears in the opening sequence of the 1987 film Dirty Dancing.
 Bob Seger's 1976 hit "Night Moves" includes the line "humming a song from 1962", which Seger meant as a reference to "Be My Baby", although he misidentified the year the song was released.
 The song is invoked and interpolated in Eddie Money's 1986 song "Take Me Home Tonight", in which Ronnie Spector replies to "Just like Ronnie sang..." with "Be my little baby".
 The song plays in the "I Am Curious… Maddie" episode of Moonlighting aired March 31, 1987, where Dave and Maddie consummated their relationship. This event not only drew the largest audience the show had, but also may have led to the show's decline.
 The 2007 single "B Boy Baby" by Mutya Buena featuring Amy Winehouse borrows melodic and lyrical passages from "Be My Baby".
 The song appears in a fantasy sequence involving Kamala Khan in the Disney+/Marvel series Ms. Marvel, in the second episode "Crushed", after Kamala comes home following an encounter with her crush, Kamran.
 The song appears at the end credits scene of Zach Cregger's film Barbarian

Awards and accolades
 In 1999, it was inducted into the Grammy Hall of Fame.
 In 2004, it was ranked number 22 on Rolling Stone list of the "500 Greatest Songs of All Time", where it was described as a "Rosetta stone for studio pioneers such as the Beatles and Brian Wilson." It was also ranked number 22 on the list's 2021 edition.
 In 2006, it was ranked number 6 on Pitchforks list of "The 200 Greatest Songs of the 1960s".
 In 2011, it was included in Times list of the "All-Time 100 Songs".
 In 2014, it was ranked number 2 on NMEs list of the "100 Best Songs of the 1960s".
 In 2017, the song topped Billboards list of the "100 Greatest Girl Group Songs of All Time".

Charts

Certification

Notes

References

Bibliography

Further reading

External links
 Library of Congress essay for its selection for the National Recording Registry.

1963 songs
1963 singles
1970 singles
1972 singles
1992 singles
2013 singles
Songs written by Jeff Barry
Songs written by Ellie Greenwich
The Ronettes songs
The Beach Boys songs
Andy Kim songs
Shaun Cassidy songs
Jody Miller songs
Leslie Grace songs
Song recordings produced by Phil Spector
Grammy Hall of Fame Award recipients
Songs written by Phil Spector
United States National Recording Registry recordings
Epic Records singles
Philles Records singles
Top Stop Music singles
Song recordings with Wall of Sound arrangements
Cashbox number-one singles